The name Annette has been used for four tropical cyclones in the Eastern Pacific Ocean, and one in the Southwest Pacific.

Eastern Pacific Ocean:
 Tropical Storm Annette (1960), paralleled close to the Mexican coastline, but did not strike land
 Tropical Storm Annette (1968), struck Mexico
 Hurricane Annette (1972), struck Mexico
 Hurricane Annette (1976), did not strike land

Southwest Pacific Ocean:
 Tropical Cyclone Annette (1994), landfall at Mandora Station; considerable damage to homes and crops and about 1,000 cattle were lost in the storm

Pacific hurricane set index articles